Keene Independent School District is a public school district based in Keene, Texas (USA).

In 2010, the school district was rated "Exemplary" by the Texas Education Agency.

Schools
 Wanda R. Smith High School (Grades 9-12)
 Keene Junior High (Grades 6-8)
 Keene Elementary (Grades PK-5)
Keene Alternative Learning Center (Special Education)

Administration

District
Ricky Stephens, Superintendent of Schools

Sandy Denning, Chief Financial Officer

Robert Hinerman, Technology Director

Shaye Ford, Administrative Assistant

Elaine Lewis, District PEIMS Coordinator

Keene High School
Chris Taylor, Principal

Jarrett Morgan, Assistant Principal

Keene Junior High School
Jamie Ingram, Principal

Keene Elementary School
Kelly Turnage, Principal

Julie McKintosh, Dean of Students

Keene Alternative Learning Center 
Ted O'Neil, Principal

References 
2016 Accountability

External links
 Keene ISD
High school
 

School districts in Johnson County, Texas